SecurityFocus was an online computer security news portal and purveyor of information security services. Home to the well-known Bugtraq mailing list, SecurityFocus columnists and writers included former Department of Justice cybercrime prosecutor Mark Rasch, and hacker-turned-journalist Kevin Poulsen.

External links
  (no longer active)

Internet properties disestablished in 2002
Computer security organizations
Gen Digital acquisitions